is a former Japanese football player.

Playing career
Kiba was born in Minamiawaji on September 6, 1974. After graduating from high school, he joined Gamba Osaka in 1993. He debuted in 1994 and he played in many matches, mainly as a center back and defensive midfielder for a long time. He also served as captain from 2001 to 2003. However he could hardly played in 2004 and he moved to Avispa Fukuoka in 2005. He did not play at all there and he left the club in July 2005. In 2006, he joined the Regional Leagues club Valiente Toyama and he played in many matches. In June 2007, he moved to the Regional Leagues club FC Mi-O Biwako Kusatsu. Although the club was promoted to the Japan Football League, he did not play in any matches. In 2008, he moved to Thailand and joined the Customs Department. He played as a regular played for three seasons and he retired at the end of the 2010 season.

Club statistics

References

External links

1974 births
Living people
Association football people from Hyōgo Prefecture
Japanese footballers
J1 League players
J2 League players
Gamba Osaka players
Avispa Fukuoka players
MIO Biwako Shiga players
Japanese expatriate footballers
Expatriate footballers in Thailand
Association football defenders